Revista Contemporánea was a Spanish language literary and cultural magazine which was published in the period 1875–1907 in Madrid, Spain. The magazine was the first publication in Spain which introduced German and French thought.

History and profile
The first issue of Revista Contemporánea appeared on 15 December 1875 in Madrid. The founder was José del Perojo who also edited the magazine in the early period. He was a political thinker.

Revista Contemporánea featured literary articles in addition to those about humanistic and scientific fields. In 1879 Perojo sold the publication to José de Cárdenas, and Francisco de Asís Pacheco replaced him as the editor of the magazine. The ideological orientation was liberal until that event, and the magazine became a conservative publication. When it held a liberal view, the magazine frequently featured articles concerning the emancipation of women. From 1901 Juan Ortega y Rubio edited the magazine. The last issue of Revista Contemporánea was published in June 1907 when the owner of the magazine, José de Cárdenas, died.

References

External links

1875 establishments in Spain
1907 disestablishments in Spain
Conservatism in Spain
Conservative magazines
Defunct literary magazines published in Europe
Defunct political magazines published in Spain
Literary magazines published in Spain
Magazines established in 1875
Magazines disestablished in 1907
Magazines published in Madrid
Spanish-language magazines